"Arab Money" is a song by American hip hop recording artist Busta Rhymes, released as the lead single from his eighth studio album Back on My B.S. (2009). The song features production and vocals by fellow New York City-based rapper Ron Browz.

Music video
The music video debuted on BET's 106 & Park on December 2, 2008. It is directed by Rik Cordero. It features cameos from Rick Ross, Spliff Star, DJ Drama, Jim Jones, Juelz Santana, DJ Khaled, Akon, Gorilla Zoe, Soulja Boy Tell 'Em, N.O.R.E., Lil Wayne, Kardinal Offishall, Ace Hood, Shawty Lo, Paul Wall, E-40, Jadakiss, Swizz Beatz, T-Pain, Wiz Khalifa, Mack Maine, Tyga, Triple C's, Will Smith and many others.

New York City businessman and philanthropist Ali Naqvi stars as the Arab prince of the music video. Ali is actually of Persian and Indian descent. Ali, friend of Busta Rhymes, was invited to appear in the music video. Ali is Founder and Chairman of MindShare Ventures Group. The song makes reference to Yasser Arafat and Al-Waleed bin Talal.

The music video for the 1st part of the remix was released on February 25, 2009. Just like the original, it was directed by Rik Cordero in front of a green screen. T-Pain is not featured in the video, and the chorus is changed back to the original. Any Arabic words were not used. T.I., Birdman, & Cedric The Entertainer make cameo appearances in the video.

The music video for the 2nd part of the remix was released on February 27, two days after the 1st part of the remix's video. Just like the original, it was directed by Rik Cordero in front of a green screen. Reek Da Villian is not featured in the video.

In other media
The song is heavily featured in the 2009 video game Grand Theft Auto: The Ballad of Gay Tony as the favorite song of the eccentric property developer Yusuf Amir.

Remixes
The song was officially remixed three times by Busta Rhymes, with different guest appearances accompanying each version.

Part 1
The first part of the remix features Ron Browz, P Diddy, Swizz Beatz, T-Pain, Akon and Lil Wayne. The song was released on Thanksgiving Day (November 27, 2008).  Ron Browz, T-Pain, Akon and Lil Wayne all use the Autotune effect in it.

Also, in this part, Busta Rhymes does the main part of the hook differently and Ron Browz pronounced Arab money differently with an accent on the "A"s. Therefore,   would be pronounced  . Unlike the original, actual Arabic is used in the chorus and by the artists in their verses:

Chorus: "Bismillāhi r-raḥmāni r-raḥīm. Al ḥamdu lillāhi rabbi l-'ālamīn"
Translation: "In the name of God, most Gracious most Merciful. All Praise is due to God, Lord of the worlds.
The chorus used in video is the same chorus as the original.
Busta Rhymes: "As-Salamu Alaykum Warahmatullah Wa Barakatu"
Translation: "May Peace and blessings of God be upon you" (A Greeting)
What was used in the video: "While I stack another billion and give it to the block fool"
Diddy: "Al hamdu lillah"
Translation: "All Praises to God"
What they  rhymed the phrase with: "With my billions pilin'"
Swizz Beatz: "Habibi"
Translation: "My Love (Masculine Form)"
What they rhymed the phrase with: "While she feedin' me linguine"
Akon: "Bismillāhi r-raḥmāni r-raḥīm"
Translation: "In the name of God, most gracious most merciful."
What they rhymed the phrase with: "Straight cash when I come in, let me exchange the currency cause it's all foreign"

This version was planned for inclusion on Ron Browz's as-yet-unreleased debut album, Etherboy, but the album was shelved.

Part 2
The second part of the remix features Ron Browz, Reek Da Villian, Rick Ross, Spliff Star, N.O.R.E., & Red Cafe. The song was released on December 13, 2008.

Part 3
The third part of the remix features Ron Browz, Juelz Santana, Jim Jones, & Jadakiss. The song was released on December 21, 2008. This remix is the only one to not feature a music video.

Two other versions of the song were produced, the first one featured the rapper Pitbull and the second featured Rick Ross

Track listings
Digital download
Explicit
 "Arab Money" – 2:47
Clean
 "Arab Money" – 2:47

U.S. Promo CDS
 "Arab Money" (Radio) – 2:47
 "Arab Money" (Dirty) – 2:47
 "Arab Money" (Instrumental) – 2:47
 "Arab Money" (Acapella Clean) – 2:37
 "Arab Money" (Acapella Dirty) – 2:37

Charts

Controversy in the United Arab Emirates and other Arab communities

Arab Money ignited controversy, particularly from Muslim communities. The released remix came with even stronger negative reaction, as it quotes lines from the Quran, which (in such a form) is deemed forbidden in most Arab countries. DJ Steve Sutherland of Galaxy FM was suspended temporarily when he played the song and listeners complained. In response, Busta stated: 
Sometimes, people like to twist things. We ain't mockin' the culture. We ain't tryin' to be disrespectful. Ain't no racism going on right here. If you listen to the song, you see that we are actually acknowledging the fact that the Arabian culture, a Middle East culture is one of the few cultures, that value passing down hard work riches that's been built amongst the family. It would be nice if a lot of other cultures did the same thing. Feel me? So, I would like for it to be like that in my culture where we could build things to the point where we got so much that we don't need to rely on other cultures to contribute majorly in a financial way, or in whatever other way, to societies, communities or whatever governments we might live in. So, we are actually biggin' up the culture. At the end of the day, I want to be like that. I think a lot of us want to be like that.

References

2008 singles
Busta Rhymes songs
Ron Browz songs
Song recordings produced by Ron Browz
Dubai in popular culture
Songs about cities
Songs written by Busta Rhymes
Cultural depictions of Yasser Arafat
Songs written by Ron Browz
Music video controversies
Music videos directed by Dale Resteghini